Digital Artists of a Rare Kind, later known as Dark Illustrated, or simply Dark was an underground computer artscene group that primarily released ANSI, ASCII, and high resolution artwork from 1994 to 1999. Though the organization did not operate as long as ACiD, iCE, or CiA, Dark was a very influential and critically successful group. Dark was especially popular with Canadian ANSI artists, who made up a large portion of the member base.

Releases 

Dark's monthly artpacks, referred to as "collections", were organized a bit differently than other artscene groups. While the naming scheme for the collections was the common "month/year" format (i.e.  for Dark Collection 02/95, or February 1995), Dark titled the digital artwork files themselves in a unique manner.

Dark chose not to follow the traditional "two character" artist abbreviation format, where the first two characters of an 8.3 filename are reserved for artist initials, followed by a dash, then a five character title. Instead the first five characters were reserved for the artist's name, followed by a dash, then a two digit number representing how many pieces the artist had released for the year. In addition, Dark, not unlike artscene groups such as Cia and iCE, used a shortened version of their group name as the file suffix for ANSI files. In this case,  became .

Dark was also the only artscene group to release annual "best of" compilations.

Collections
 Dark Collection #01 (first collection)
 Dark Collection #44 Disk A (final collection)
 Dark Collection #44 Disk B
 Dark Collection #44 Disk C

Annual "Best of" Compilations
 Dark Best of 1994
 Dark Best of 1995
 Dark Best of 1996
 Dark Best of 1997
 Dark Best of 1998

External links 
 Dark Domain The ACiD Artpacks Archive on DVD, contains all available Dark Collections.
 darkillustrated.org Dark Illustrated's home on the internet. Very outdated. (offline)
 Dark Illustrated Legacy: A Decadent Recollection. (offline)

1994 establishments in Canada
Artscene groups
1999 disestablishments in Canada